DNA2 may refer to:
 DNA², a Japanese science fiction manga series
 DNA2 (gene), a human gene which encodes the enzyme DNA2-like helicase